Artyomov or Artemov and Artyomova or Artemova (feminine) is a common Russian surname.

It may refer to:

People 
Aleksei Artyomov (1983-), Russian football player
Nikolay Artemov (1908—2005), Russian physiologist
Sergey Artyomov (b. 1978), Russian professional footballer
Sergei N. Artemov (b. 1951), Russian and American mathematician
Vladimir Artemov (b. 1964), Russian gymnast
Vyacheslav Artyomov, (b. 1940), Russian and Soviet composer
Natalya Artyomova (b. 1963), Russian middle-distance runner

Places 
Artyomov (village), a village (khutor) in Rostov Oblast, Russia

References
 

Russian-language surnames